The Scout and Guide movement in Namibia is served by:
 The Girl Guides Association of Namibia, member of the World Association of Girl Guides and Girl Scouts
 Scouts of Namibia, member of the World Organization of the Scout Movement
 Deutscher Pfadfinderbund in Namibia (German Scout Association of Namibia, a small association open mainly to boys and girls of German descent

External links